Fritz the Cat is the 1972 soundtrack album to the Ralph Bakshi directed animated film of the same name.

The soundtrack features a number of blues, funk and rock and roll songs as well as the film's score, which consists of soul-jazz performed by Ed Bogas and Ray Shanklin.

The album was originally released on Fantasy Records in 1972. It was later re-released in 1996 on compact disc as part of a compilation that featured both the soundtracks to Fritz the Cat and another Ralph Bakshi feature, Heavy Traffic, on the same disc.

Various musical cues and instrumental songs from the film are not featured on the soundtrack and remain unreleased to this day. 
On November 23, 2018, Varese Sarabande Records reissued the soundtrack on a picture disc LP.

Track listing 
 Side one
 Black Talk (Earland) – 2:28
 Performed by Charles Earland/Melvin Sparks/Idris Muhammad
 Duke's Theme (Ray Shanklin) – 5:25
 Fritz the Cat (Crumb-Bogas) – 0:55
 Performed by Alice Stuart
 Mamblues (Tjader) – 3:00
 Performed by Cal Tjader
 Bo Diddley (Ellas McDaniel) – 2:20
 Performed by Bo Diddley
 Bertha's Theme (Shanklin) – 4:56

 Side two
 Winston (Ed Bogas) – 2:18
 Performed by The Innocent Bystanders
 House Rock (Bogas-Day) – 2:52
 The Synagogue (Traditional, arr. Bogas) – 1:11
 Yesterdays (Harbach-Kern) – 3:25
 Performed by Billie Holiday
 Love Light of Mine (Betty Watson) – 2:47
 Performed by The Watson Sisters
 The Riot (Bogas-Saunders) – 3:07
 You're The Only Girl (I Ever Really Loved) (Krantz-Bogas-Shanklin) – 3:10
 Performed by Jim Post

References 

1972 soundtrack albums
Ed Bogas albums
Fantasy Records soundtracks
Fritz the Cat
Ray Shanklin albums
Soul jazz albums
Comedy film soundtracks